Nels Andersen (January 15, 1891 – May 4, 1961) was a member of the Wisconsin State Assembly.

Biography
An emigrant from Denmark, Andersen was born on January 15, 1891. He married Anna M. Knutzen in 1925 and they settled in Ford, Wisconsin in 1928. Andersen died on May 4, 1961 and was buried in Gilman, Taylor County, Wisconsin.

Career
Andersen was a member of the Wisconsin State Assembly as a Republican during the 1947 and 1949 sessions. In addition, he was Town Chairman (similar to Mayor) and a member of the School Board of Ford and Chairman of the County Board of Taylor County, Wisconsin. Andersen was a director of the Taylor County National Farm Loan Association.

References

Danish emigrants to the United States
Republican Party members of the Wisconsin State Assembly
Mayors of places in Wisconsin
School board members in Wisconsin
1891 births
1961 deaths
Burials in Wisconsin
20th-century American politicians